The Graduate College at Princeton University is a residential college which serves as the center of graduate student life at Princeton. Wyman House, adjacent to the Graduate College, serves as the official residence of the current Dean of the Graduate School. 

Thomson College, the central quadrangle now commonly known as the Old Graduate College, is a memorial to United States Senator John R. Thomson 1817 provided by a bequest left by his widow, Mrs. J. A. W. Thomson Swann, the Graduate College's first benefactor.

It was dedicated on October 22, 1913, during the tenure of the first dean of the Graduate School, Andrew Fleming West, and was the first residential college in the United States devoted solely to postgraduate liberal studies. The group of  Collegiate Gothic buildings was designed by Ralph Adams Cram and located on a hill, one-half mile west of the main campus. Its most prominent architectural landmark is the 173-ft-high  Cleveland Tower, which features one of the largest carillons in the United States. Cleveland Tower adjoins the Old Graduate College, which also includes Procter Hall, the Van Dyke Library, Pyne Tower, and North Court. In 1962, the New Graduate College (colloquially, "new GC") was built to expand the Old Graduate College to the south-west, although it features a more modern architectural style.

The Graduate College currently houses approximately 430 graduate students, mostly in their first-year of graduate study. The Graduate College's Pyne Tower is also the home of the current administrator in residence. It has been featured in the films Admission and Runner Runner.

References

External links

Princeton University: The Graduate College
Princeton University Graduate College: History and Photos

Graduate College
Ralph Adams Cram buildings
Historic district contributing properties in Mercer County, New Jersey
1913 establishments in New Jersey